Pilar Bastardés is a Spanish actress. She has appeared largely in Spanish theatre and television productions. In 2008 she appeared in Antonio del Real's historical film La Conjura de El Escorial set during the reign of King Philip II of Spain.

External links
 

Spanish stage actresses
Living people
Spanish television actresses
Year of birth missing (living people)
21st-century Spanish actresses
Place of birth missing (living people)